The Healdsburg, California Prune Packers is the collegiate level summer baseball team which has been playing at Recreation Park since 1921.  Operating under various organizational structures over the years, the Packers became a part of the California Collegiate League in 2014.

History

Founding years 
In February 1921, under the leadership of the Healdsburg Chamber of Commerce, a new baseball team was organized.  The first game was played on 15 May 1921 with Red Corrick pitching.  The first year included 21 Sunday games against the Nucoa Butters, the Petaluma Leghorns, the Santa Rosa Rosebuds, the San Francisco Ninantic Parlor, the Vallejo Y.M.I., Oakland Maxwell Hardware, San Francisco M.J. B. Coffee Kids and the San Francisco Associated Terminals.

In the first five years, the Prune Packers earned an enviable record:  1921 14 W, 9 L; 1922 20 W, 6 L; 1923 22 W, 4 L; 1924 20 W, 6 L; 1925 7 W, 2L.  In July 1925, the team was suddenly disbanded by the Healdsburg Chamber of Commerce and the baseball committee when the finances of the team proved untenable.  At the time of the disbanding, the Santa Rosa and Petaluma teams had already folded and the 
St. Helena and Napa teams were expected to disband shortly.

1930s 
In 1930, the Prune Packers represented Healdsburg in the Sonoma County League.

While the 1931 season was threatened with cancellation because of lack of local support, the Prune Packers won the championship in the Redwood Empire League.

In 1932, the Prune Packers attempted to operate as a non-league-affiliated team to play various local teams.  Only one game appears to have been played, against Lakeport, which the Packers lost.

A full 1933 season of 20 games was played, but the final game was canceled because of the approaching starts of colleges and high schools.  The Prune Packers won 12 games and lost 8.

In 1938, the I.O.O.F. sponsored Healdsburg baseball using the organization's three links as a logo and without using the Prune Packers name.

While baseball continued in Healdsburg under the auspices of the Odd Fellows during the 1940s, the Prune Packers were not active.

In 1949, lights were added to Recreation Park.

1951–1962 
In 1951, the Odd Fellows withdrew from supporting local baseball and the Healdsburg Lighting Committee took over local adult baseball and resurrected the team with a two night per week (Friday and Saturday) schedule.  All local citizens were welcome to try out for the team.

The Prune Packers maintained an active schedule through the 1950s including winning the Redwood Empire Baseball League championship in 1952.  In 1955, a high point was achieved when the Prune Packers beat the Seals.

The Prune Packers suffered during the 1962 season with attempts at reorganizing the league and a final 1961–1962 record of 6–8.

2011–2022 
Community volunteers and local fundraising enabled the Recreation Park grandstands to be restored in 2011.  This was the first major restoration since the grandstands were brought from the Cotati Speedway in 1923.

After a 50-year lapse, in 2012, the Prune Packers returned to play 48 games including 16 games in the Sacramento Rural League.

In 2013, the Prune Packers had a 31 W, 25 L record in the Sacramento Rural League.

For 2014, president Riley Sullivan hired former pro Joey Gomes as the manager/general manager.  Joey's younger brother, Jonny Gomes, was also a baseball star.  The team incorporated as a California Not-For-Profit Corporation and moved to the Golden State Collegiate Baseball League, now the California Collegiate League.

The 2015 season reported a 37–17 record in the collegiate league.

In 2016, the record was 37–14.  Three pitchers each contributed four wins: Andrew Vaughan (4-0), Steven Wilson (4-1) and Justin Mullins (4-2).  Jake Scheiner (1B-3B) led the team with a batting average of .376. 

The Prune Packers reported a 36–15 record for 2017.  Pitcher Chase Gardner lead the Packers with a 5–0 record.

During 2018, the record was 36–10.  Ryan Shreve led the Prune Packers pitching with a 4–0 record.

The record was 33–7 in 2019.  Elijah Birdsong led Prune Packers pitching with a 5–0 record.

The team did not play during the 2020 COVID-19 year.

The Prune Packers celebrated its 100th anniversary in 2021 with a 45–7 season and by winning the CCL State Championship.  Pitcher Marvcus Guarin earned a 7–0 record in support of the Prune Packer's season.

The team recorded a 38 win and 10 loss season for 2022 and won the CCL Championship in its final game at San Luis Obispo. The summer roster featured Elijah Birdsong and Brandon Paulson, regarded as Major League prospects.

Notable alumni 
Jason Alexander- pitched for Prune Packers in 2017
Anthony Bender - pitched for the Prune Packers in 2014-16.
Steven Wilson - pitched for the Prune Packers in 2015-16.
Joe Ryan - pitched for Prune Packers in 2014.  
 Andrew Vaughn - pitched for the Prune Packers in 2016. - Joined the Chicago White Sox.
 Jake Scheiner - hit .376 for the Prune Packers in 2016.  - Joined the Seattle Mariners.
 Cooper Casad - had a 3-4 record pitching for the Prune Packers in 2017. - Signed with the San Francisco Giants.
 Billy Wilson - hit .291 for the Prune Packers in 2016. - He signed with the Cleveland Indians.
 Cal Conley - drafted by Atlanta Braves in 2021 - Hit .376 for the Prune Packers in 2019.
 Ian Villers - drafted by San Francisco Giants in 2021 - Recorded 4 wins and 0 losses for the Prune Packers in 2019.
 Quentin Selma - drafted by the Los Angeles Angels in 2021. - Hit .306 for the Prune Packers in 2018.
 Brandon Poulson - signed with the Minnesota Twins in 2014.
 Lee Walker - signed with the Boston Red Sox.

Season-by-season records

References

External links 

 
Baseball teams established in 1921
College baseball teams in California
Organizations based in Sonoma County, California